The Diamant premetro station is a station on the Brussels Metro located in the municipality of Schaerbeek in Brussels, Belgium. It was inaugurated on May 2, 1972. The station is a "premetro" station. It is thus not used by conventional subway trains, but by Brussels trams. It is one of four subway stations of the so-called Greater Ring axis built in the 1970s, which runs under the greater ring road. This underground station is currently served by tram routes 7 and 25. It offers a connection with bus routes 12, 21, 28, 29 and 79 at ground level. 

The station gets its name from the avenue of the same name Avenue Diamant/Diamantlaan. It is located at the crossroad between this avenue, the greater ring, the Avenue des Cerisiers/Kerselarenlaan and the Avenue de Roodebeek/Roodebeeklaan next to the buildings of the public television and radio networks, the Dutch-speaking VRT and the French-speaking RTBF. It was built at the same time as the E40 freeway which ends here and splits into several tunnels and off-ramps. 

Brussels metro stations
Schaerbeek